Level Five is a 1997 French pseudo-documentary or fake documentary film, directed by Chris Marker and starring Catherine Belkhodja.

Plot
Laura, the widow of a computer programmer. Attempts to overcome her grief by completing her late husband's last work, a video game reconstruction of the  Battle of Okinawa in which she hopes to simulate an alternative outcome to the historical tragedy. All the while she documents the process, intending to provide the material for a new film by her late husband's friend Chris Marker.

Cast
 Catherine Belkhodja as Laura
 Chris Marker as himself and narrator
 Kenji Tokitsu, martial artist, interviewed as himself
 Nagisa Oshima, cineast, interviewed as himself
 Ju'nishi Ushiyama as himself
 Kinjo Shigeaki as himself

Reception
Keith Uhlich of The A.V. Club named the re-release of Level Five the sixth-best film of 2014, tying it with The Congress.

References

External links
 
 
 
 Level Five Transcripts

1997 films
1997 documentary films
Battle of Okinawa
Films directed by Chris Marker
French documentary films
1990s French-language films
Films about video games
Films about virtual reality
Films produced by Anatole Dauman
Japan in non-Japanese culture
1990s French films